Caskey is a surname. Notable people with the surname include:

 Alex Caskey (born 1988), American soccer player
 Billy Caskey (born 1954), Northern Ireland footballer
 C. Thomas Caskey, American physician and geneticist
 Craig Caskey (born 1949), American baseball player
 Darren Caskey (born 1974), English footballer
 Elizabeth Caskey (1910-1994), Classical scholar
 John Caskey (1908–1981), American archaeologist and classical scholar
 Lafayette Caskey (1824-1881), American politician and carpenter
 Caskey (rapper), American rapper